Ivan Frgić (18 July 1953, in Sombor – 31 October 2015, in Sombor) was a Serbian wrestler of Croat origin who competed in the 1976 Summer Olympics and in the 1980 Summer Olympics. He was born in Sombor.

References

1953 births
2015 deaths
Sportspeople from Sombor
Serbian male sport wrestlers
Olympic wrestlers of Yugoslavia
Wrestlers at the 1976 Summer Olympics
Wrestlers at the 1980 Summer Olympics
Yugoslav male sport wrestlers
Olympic silver medalists for Yugoslavia
Olympic medalists in wrestling
Croats of Vojvodina
World Wrestling Championships medalists
Medalists at the 1976 Summer Olympics
European Wrestling Championships medalists
Mediterranean Games medalists in wrestling
Mediterranean Games gold medalists for Yugoslavia